The 1902 South Carolina Gamecocks football team represented South Carolina College—now known as the University of South Carolina–as an independent during the 1902 college football season. Led by first-year head coach Bob Williams, South Carolina compiled a record of 6–1. The team defeated Clemson on October 30.

Schedule

Roster
The following players were members of the 1902 football team according to the roster published in the 1902 and 1903 editions of The Garnet and Black, the South Carolina yearbook.

References

South Carolina
South Carolina Gamecocks football seasons
South Carolina Gamecocks football